Mount Woodring is located in the Teton Range, Grand Teton National Park, Wyoming. The mountain is immediately west of Leigh Lake and is sandwiched between Paintbrush Canyon to the south and Leigh Canyon to the north. The best access to the summit is from Paintbrush Divide along the Paintbrush Canyon Trail.

References

Woodring
Woodring
Woodring